Lukas Van Eenoo (born 6 February 1991) is a Belgian professional footballer who plays as a central midfielder for Belgian First Division A club Westerlo.

Career
Van Eenoo made his debut for the first team of Cercle Brugge during the Bruges derby against Club Brugge. He was a substitute for Honour Gombami. Van Eenoo also played for various Belgian national youth teams. On 22 July 2010, he scored his first senior team goal in a UEFA Europa League qualifying match against Turun Palloseura, thereby securing a place for his team in the third round of qualification.

Career statistics

Honours 
Cercle Brugge

 Belgian Cup runner-up: 2009–10, 2012–13

Westerlo

 Belgian First Division B: 2021–22

References

External links
 Lukas Van Eenoo player info at the official Cercle Brugge website 
 
 

1991 births
Living people
Belgian footballers
Association football midfielders
Cercle Brugge K.S.V. players
Oud-Heverlee Leuven players
K.V. Kortrijk players
K.S.V. Roeselare players
K.V.C. Westerlo players
Belgian Pro League players
Challenger Pro League players
Footballers from Bruges